The 2021 Supersport World Championship was the twenty-fifth season of the Supersport World Championship, the twenty-third held under this name. The championship was won by Dominique Aegerter.

Race calendar and results

Entry list

All entries used Pirelli tyres.

Championship standings
Points

Riders' championship

Manufacturers' championship

Notes

References

External links
Official website

Supersport
Supersport World Championship seasons